Michael Mean (born 18 February 1947) is a British sprint canoer who competed in the late 1960s. He was eliminated in the semifinals of the K-4 1000 m event at the 1968 Summer Olympics in Mexico City.

References
Sports-reference.com profile

1947 births
Canoeists at the 1968 Summer Olympics
Living people
Olympic canoeists of Great Britain
British male canoeists